Morristown Junior-Senior High School is located in Morristown, Indiana, United States. It serves grades 6-12 for the Shelby Eastern Schools.

See also
 List of high schools in Indiana

References

External links

Public middle schools in Indiana
Public high schools in Indiana
Schools in Shelby County, Indiana